William Henry Milnes Marsden MBE (1873–1956) was a British solicitor and philatelist who was added to the Roll of Distinguished Philatelists in 1947. He was a Justice of the Peace.

Milnes Marsden was an expert in the philately of Bosnia, for which he won awards. He contributed on that subject to the Kohl Briefmarken-Handbuch. He was a Vice-President of the Royal Philatelic Society London.

He was the son of W. H. Marsden J.P. of Derby, and was educated at Repton School.

References

Signatories to the Roll of Distinguished Philatelists
1873 births
1956 deaths
British philatelists
Members of the Order of the British Empire
British solicitors
Fellows of the Royal Philatelic Society London
Philately of Bosnia and Herzegovina